John McDonald (April 6, 1773 - 1826) was an American politician from Maine. McDonald was a member of the 1st Maine Senate after statehood. He served 4 terms in the Maine Senate, retiring in 1824. Originally from Gorham, Maine, McDonald was an early settler in Limerick, Maine. His son, Moses, later served in Maine government and as a two-term Congressman during the 1850s.

References

1773 births
1826 deaths
Politicians from Gorham, Maine
People from Limerick, Maine
Maine state senators